Charles Francis Hansom (27 July 1817 – 30 November 1888) was a prominent Roman Catholic Victorian architect who primarily designed in the Gothic Revival style.

Career
He was born of a Roman Catholic family in York. He was the brother of Joseph Aloysius Hansom, architect and creator of the Hansom cab, and father of the architect Edward Joseph Hansom. He practised in partnership with his brother, Joseph, in London from 1854. This partnership was dissolved in 1859 when Charles established an independent practice in Bath with his son Edward (born 22 October 1842) as an articled clerk. He took his son into partnership in 1867, by which time the practice had moved to Bristol, with a large West Country practice of church and collegiate architecture. In Bristol he took on Benjamin Bucknall as an assistant.

Clifton College

The original Clifton College buildings were all designed by Hansom.

His first design at Clifton was for Big School (then a meeting hall and now the school canteen) and a proposed dining hall. Only the former was actually built and a small extra short wing was added in 1866. This is what now contains the Marshal's office and the new staircase into Big School.

Hansom was called back to the College in the 1870s and asked to design what is now the Percival Library and the open-cloister classrooms. This project was undertaken in two stages and largely completed by 1875, although the Wilson Tower was not built until 1890.

Works (new built)
 Our Lady the Immaculate Conception Roman Catholic Church, Devizes, Wiltshire, 1865
 St Osburg's Church, Coventry, 1845
 St Anne's Church, Edge Hill, Liverpool, 1845–46
 Our Lady and St. Alphonsus Roman Catholic Church, Hanley Swan, Worcestershire, 1846
 St David Lewis and St Francis Xavier Church, Usk, Monmouthshire, 1847
 Our Lady of Dolours chapel, Ferndown, Dorset, 1847–51
 Erdington Abbey, Erdington, Warwickshire, nr. Birmingham, 1848
 St Mary and St John Church, Wolverhampton, West Midlands, 1851 to 1855.
 St Gregory's Roman Catholic Church, Cheltenham, Gloucestershire, 1854–77
 Plymouth Cathedral (with Joseph Hansom), 1856–58
 Our Lady of the Angels and St Peter in Chains Church, Stoke-on-Trent, 1857
 St Joseph's Church, Weston-super-Mare, 1858
 Little Malvern Court, Little Malvern, Worcestershire: west wing, 1860
 Eyre Memorial Chantry, Perrymead Roman Catholic cemetery, Lyncombe, Bath, Somerset, c.1860; altar carved by Boulton of Cheltenham to Hansom's design
 St John's, Bath, Somerset, 1861–63
 Holy Family Roman Catholic Church, Broxwood, Herefordshire, 1863
 Rhydd Court, Guarlford, Worcestershire: chapel, 1863
 Malvern College, Worcestershire, 1863–71
 Church of St Mary, Bradenstoke, Wiltshire, 1866
 St Pauls, Clifton, 1867
 Church of the Annunciation to the Blessed Virgin Mary, Souldern, Oxfordshire, 1869–70
 Woodchester Park, Nympsfield, Gloucestershire (first scheme)
 Christ Church, Barton Hill, Bristol, 1883 (demolished 1957)
 St Joseph and Teresa RC Church, Wells, Somerset, 1877
 St Clare's Abbey, Darlington (1856-7)

Remodellings
St. Stephen, Bristol, 1880s.

References

Sources

Clifton College archives

1817 births
1888 deaths
People from York
19th-century English architects
Gothic Revival architects
Architects of Roman Catholic churches
English Roman Catholics
English ecclesiastical architects
Architects of cathedrals
People from Clifton, Bristol
Architects from Yorkshire